L'Ordre can refer to:

L'Ordre (novel), 1929 novel by Marcel Arland which won the Prix Goncourt
L'Ordre (TV), 1986 4-episode TV series by Étienne Périer